Marijke Schaar (born 12 November 1944), also known under her maiden name Marijke Jansen, is a former Dutch female tennis player who was active during the 1960s and 1970s. She reached a highest singles ranking of world number 21 in 1971. She had her most successful year in 1971 when she reached the semifinal of the singles event at the French Open, losing to eventual champion Evonne Goolagong, and the fourth round of the Wimbledon Championships.

In March 1969 she won the singles title at the Cannes Championships, defeating compatriot Betty Stöve in the final in three sets.

Schaar was a member of the Dutch Federation Cup team which reached the final in 1968.

On 23 November 1968 she married Nico Schaar.

Career finals

Singles (2 losses)

Doubles (1 loss)

References

External links 
 
 
 
 

1944 births
Living people
Dutch female tennis players
Sportspeople from The Hague
20th-century Dutch women
20th-century Dutch people
21st-century Dutch women